(My heart and your voice), WAB 79 is a lied composed by Anton Bruckner in 1868.

History 
Bruckner composed the lied on a text of August von Platen, in 1868 during his stay in Linz. He dedicated it to Pauline Hofmann, sister of his pupil Helene Hofmann.

In 1930, the work was published in Band III/2, pp. 144–150 of the Göllerich/Auer biography.

Text 

The song is based on a text by August von Platen, to which Bruckner made three small changes:

Music 
The 60-bar long work in A major is scored for solo voice and piano. The continuous triplet figures on the piano ensure a uniform background for the song.

Discography 
There are three recordings of Mein Herz und deine Stimme:
 Marie Luise Bart-Larsson (soprano), Gernot Martzy (piano), Kammermusikalische Kostbarkeiten von Anton Bruckner – CD: Weinberg Records SW 01 036-2, 1996
 Robert Holzer (bass), Thomas Kerbl (piano), Anton Bruckner Lieder/Magnificat – CD: LIVA 046, 2011. NB: Transposed in F major.
 Elisabeth Wimmer (soprano), Daniel Linton-France (piano) in "Bruckner, Anton – Böck liest Bruckner I" – CD – Gramola 99195, 3 October 2018

References

Sources 
 August Göllerich, Anton Bruckner. Ein Lebens- und Schaffens-Bild,  – posthumous edited by Max Auer by G. Bosse, Regensburg, 1932
 Anton Bruckner – Sämtliche Werke, Band XXIII/1: Lieder für Gesang und Klavier (1851–1882), Musikwissenschaftlicher Verlag der Internationalen Bruckner-Gesellschaft, Angela Pachovsky (Editor), Vienna, 1997
 Cornelis van Zwol, Anton Bruckner 1824–1896 – Leven en werken, uitg. Thoth, Bussum, Netherlands, 2012. 
 Uwe Harten, Anton Bruckner. Ein Handbuch. , Salzburg, 1996. .
 Crawford Howie, Anton Bruckner - A documentary biography, online revised edition

External links 
 
 Mein Herz und deine Stimme A-Dur, WAB 79 – Critical discography by Hans Roelofs 
 Von Platen's original text with English translation is available on The LiederNet Archive: "Her voice"
 Robert Holzer's performance can also be heard on YouTube: A. Bruckner - Mein Herz und deine Stimme

Lieder by Anton Bruckner
1868 compositions
Compositions in A major